Jon Louis Bentley (born February 20, 1953) is an American computer scientist who is credited with the heuristic-based partitioning algorithm k-d tree.

Education and career
Bentley received a B.S. in mathematical sciences from Stanford University in 1974, and M.S. and PhD in 1976 from the University of North Carolina at Chapel Hill; while a student, he also held internships at the Xerox Palo Alto Research Center and Stanford Linear Accelerator Center. After receiving his Ph.D., he joined the faculty at Carnegie Mellon University as an assistant professor of computer science and mathematics.  At CMU, his students included Brian Reid, John Ousterhout, Jeff Eppinger, Joshua Bloch, and James Gosling, and he was one of Charles Leiserson's advisors. Later, Bentley moved to Bell Laboratories, where he co-authored an optimized Quicksort algorithm with Doug McIlroy.

He found an optimal solution for the two dimensional case of Klee's measure problem: given a set of n rectangles, find the area of their union. He and Thomas Ottmann invented the Bentley–Ottmann algorithm, an efficient algorithm for finding all intersecting pairs among a collection of line segments. He wrote the Programming Pearls column for the Communications of the ACM magazine, and later collected the articles into two books of the same name.

Bentley received the Dr. Dobb's Excellence in Programming award in 2004.

Bibliography
 Programming Pearls (2nd edition), .
 More Programming Pearls: Confessions of a Coder, .
 Writing Efficient Programs, .
 Divide and Conquer Algorithms in Multidimensional Space, Ph.D. thesis.

References

External links
 www.cs.bell-labs.com/cm/cs/pearls/code.html on GitHub
 Lucent Technologies press release 
 bug in Jon Bentley's binary search - google research
 The C Programming Language, both editions had shown the solution to the bug discussed in the above. In the second edition, it is in section 6.4 (Pointers to Structures).

1953 births
Living people
American computer scientists
American computer programmers
Researchers in geometric algorithms
Carnegie Mellon University faculty
Stanford University School of Humanities and Sciences alumni
University of North Carolina at Chapel Hill alumni
People from Long Beach, California